Escondida is a copper mine at  elevation in the Atacama Desert in Antofagasta Region, Chile.

Geology
The Escondida deposit is one of a cluster of porphyry coppers in an elongated area about 18 km north–south and 3 km east–west and is associated with the 600 km long West Fissure (Falla Oeste) system, which is in turn associated with most of the major Chilean porphyry deposits. A barren, leached cap, in places up to 300 metres thick, overlies a thick zone of high grade secondary supergene mineralisation of the main orebody, largely chalcocite and covellite, which in turn overlies the unaltered primary mineralisation of chalcopyrite, bornite and pyrite.

Reserves
At mid 2007, Escondida had total proven and probable reserves of 34.7 million tonnes of copper, of which 22.5 million tonnes is estimated to be recoverable. Total resources (including reserves) were 57.6 million tonnes of copper, of which 33.0 million tonnes should be recovered. Exploration continues. As of 2019, the known resource is 21.7 Billion tonnes at 0.54 percent Copper including Escondida and adjacent deposits. The mine and ancillary industries contributes 2.5% to Chile’s GDP.

Operation
Sulfide ore, which contributes 77% of the recoverable copper reserve, is crushed and milled in one of the two concentrators and the copper concentrate is separated out using froth flotation. Approximately 86% of the copper is recovered. It is piped down to the port of Coloso, where it is dewatered before shipping. Oxide ore, 4% of recoverable copper, is crushed, agglomerated and then acid leached in large heaps, and the copper is recovered from the leach solutions as copper cathode in a solvent extraction/electrowinning (SX/EW) plant. Recovery is 68%. The low grade sulfide ore contributes 19% of recoverable copper. It is also crushed and dumped on large heaps, but here the leaching occurs through oxidation induced by microorganisms. The copper is also recovered by SX/EW.

In 2006, 338.6 million tonnes were mined (928,000 tonnes per day), of which 251.5 million tonnes were waste and oxide ore. Sulphide ore totalled 87.1 million tonnes or 239,000 tonnes per day. The two camps, San Lorenzo and 2000, cater to 7,000 people daily. Esconidida's current capacity is around 1.4 million tonnes of copper production per year, making it the largest copper mine in the world.

In 2005, Degrémont Industry was asked to install a new Sea Water Reverse Osmosis plant with capacity to produce 12 Million gallons of fresh water per day.

Construction of work force accommodation camps and field offices are needed services in order to have the mine operating, on this note Tecno Fast in 2012 was hired to build the second phase of the respective workforce accommodation camp for Escondida Mine.

BHP buys 3 TWh of electricity per year to operate the Escondida and Spence mines (1.640 m elevation), where solar energy is more than 3.000 kWh/m2 per year.

See also
Chuquicamata
El Teniente
El Salvador mine
Los Pelambres mine
Potrerillos, Chile
Chanarcillo
El Salvador mine

References

External links
 Great Deposits of the World  –  La Escondida Porphyry Copper, Chile, updated October 17, 2019

Atacama Desert
Copper mines in Chile
Mines in Antofagasta Region
Open-pit mines
Surface mines in Chile